Ryan Nielsen (born March 20, 1979) is an American football coach who is the defensive coordinator for the Atlanta Falcons of the National Football League (NFL).

Playing career 
Nielsen played defensive tackle at USC from 1997 to 2001, where he started 30 games and garnered an All-Pac 10 honorable mention in 1999. Upon graduating from USC in 2002, he signed a contract with the Philadelphia Eagles in 2002 but did not make it past training camp. He also spent time with the Los Angeles Avengers of the Arena Football League.

Coaching career 
Nielsen began his coaching career as a volunteer assistant at his alma mater USC in 2002. He also spent time as an administrative assistant at Idaho under former USC assistant Nick Holt. He was hired away as a graduate assistant at Ole Miss under his position coach at USC, Ed Orgeron, and was promoted to defensive line coach before the season began. He also had stints at Central Connecticut State and UT Martin before being hired at Northern Illinois in 2011 as a co-defensive coordinator. He followed Huskies head coach Dave Doeren to NC State in 2013 to serve as his defensive line coach and recruiting coordinator. He added the title of run game coordinator in 2014.

New Orleans Saints 
Nielsen was hired as the defensive line coach for the New Orleans Saints on February 9, 2017.

Nielsen was offered the defensive coordinator position at LSU in 2021, but elected to remain with the Saints where he was promoted with the added title of assistant head coach in 2021.

Nielsen was promoted to co-defensive coordinator for the New Orleans Saints in 2022.

Atlanta Falcons 

On January 27, 2023, Nielsen was hired as defensive coordinator for the Atlanta Falcons.

References

External links
 New Orleans Saints profile
 NC State profile

1979 births
Living people
American football defensive linemen
Central Connecticut Blue Devils football coaches
Idaho Vandals football coaches
Los Angeles Avengers players
NC State Wolfpack football coaches
New Orleans Saints coaches
Northern Illinois Huskies football coaches
Ole Miss Rebels football coaches
Philadelphia Eagles players
USC Trojans football coaches
USC Trojans football players
UT Martin Skyhawks football coaches
People from Simi Valley, California
Players of American football from Los Angeles
Sports coaches from Los Angeles
Coaches of American football from California
National Football League defensive coordinators